Kristin Thorleifsdóttir (born 13 January 1998) is a Swedish female handballer for HH Elite and the Swedish national team.

Thorleifsdóttir represented Sweden at the 2017 Women's U-19 European Handball Championship, placing 9th and at the 2018 Women's Junior World Handball Championship, placing 12th.

She also represented Sweden at the 2020 European Women's Handball Championship.

References

External links

1998 births
Living people
Handball players from Stockholm
Swedish female handball players
Swedish people of Icelandic descent
Expatriate handball players
Swedish expatriate sportspeople in Denmark
Handball players at the 2020 Summer Olympics
Olympic handball players of Sweden